Nickel(II) stearate is a metal-organic compound, a salt of nickel and stearic acid with the chemical formula . The compound is classified as a metallic soap, i.e. a metal derivative of a fatty acid. The compound is harmful if swallowed and may cause skin sensitization.

Synthesis
An exchange reaction of sodium stearate and nickel dichloride:

Physical properties
Nickel(II) stearate forms a green powder.

The compound is insoluble in water, methanol, ethanol, or ether, soluble in carbon tetrachloride and pyridine, slightly soluble in acetone.

Uses
The compound is used as a lubricant and in various industrial applications.

References

Stearates
Nickel compounds